Paul Bert Huff (June 23, 1918 – September 21, 1994) was a United States Army soldier and a recipient of the United States military's highest decoration—the Medal of Honor—for his actions in World War II.

Early life and military career
Huff was born on June 23, 1918, in Cleveland, Tennessee where he was one of nine children. At the age of five, Huff's mother died. Prior to entering the Army in 1941, Huff completed only one year of high school. At some point in his early years, Huff earned the nickname "Killer" allegedly for his ability to hunt squirrels. After he joined the Army, Huff volunteered to be a paratrooper and on November 8, 1942, he became part of the Army's first combat parachute insertion into North Africa during Operation Torch. Later, in 1944, Huff was part of the amphibious landing in Italy that began the Battle of Anzio.  On Feb. 8, 1944, while serving as a corporal in the 509th Parachute Infantry Battalion, Huff and his platoon were staked out on the Anzio beachhead when Germans attacked his company with artillery. Huff volunteered to lead a reconnaissance patrol to determine the enemy's exact location. During the patrol, Huff and his men were shot at by machine gun fire and mortars.  Not wanting to jeopardize his men, he moved forward alone, traversed a minefield under fire, and eventually killed a machine gun crew and destroyed their weapons. Having gained information on the enemy's location, Huff made his way back to his soldiers and then led them to safety.  Armed with the information gathered by Huff, an Army patrol subsequently killed 27 Germans and captured 21 others. For his bravery under fire, Huff was nominated for the Medal of Honor which was awarded to him on June 8, 1944, by Lieutenant General Mark W. Clark during a ceremony in Rome. Huff was the first paratrooper to be awarded the Medal of Honor.

Once Huff returned home, he went on a nationwide tour as part of an Army aerial show, making several parachute jumps to help raise money for war bonds. After the war ended, Huff remained in the Army eventually reaching the highest enlisted rank, command sergeant major. Huff's last assignment was command sergeant major of 101st Airborne Division's 1st Brigade in Vietnam.

Medal of Honor citation
Corporal Huff's official Medal of Honor citation reads:

Death and legacy
Paul Huff died at age 76 and was buried in Hilcrest Memorial Gardens in his hometown of Cleveland, Tennessee. He was survived by his wife, Betty Cunnyngham Huff.

Paul Huff Parkway, a major thoroughfare in Cleveland, Tennessee, is named in his honor, as is the Paul B. Huff Army Reserve Center, located in Nashville.

See also

List of Medal of Honor recipients for World War II

Notes

References

1918 births
1994 deaths
United States Army personnel of the Vietnam War
United States Army personnel of World War II
People from Cleveland, Tennessee
Recipients of the Legion of Merit
United States Army Medal of Honor recipients
United States Army soldiers
World War II recipients of the Medal of Honor